Break the Curse is a demo album by the Australian Christian extreme metal band Mortification. It was released in 1994 as Break the Curse 1990. The album focuses on Mortification's thrash metal style rather than their later death metal. Several of the album's songs were re-recorded for other Mortification albums. It was re-released on Rowe Productions in 2001 with updated artwork, an updated album booklet, and remastered audio. The album was re-released on Roxx Records as Break the Curse 1990–2010: 20th Anniversary Gold Edition in 2010 as a two-disc set with a CD containing bonus tracks and a DVD containing footage from Mortification's first crossover concert on 15 June 1990 at Harvest Centre in Melbourne, Australia, and later on vinyl as Break the Curse 1990: 25th Anniversary in July 2015. In 2022, the album was re-released as Break the Curse on Soundmass with remastered audio and a second disc containing the audio from the 2010 DVD.

Recording history
Break the Curse was recorded in April 1990 while vocalist/bassist Steve Rowe, drummer Jayson Sherlock, and guitarist Cameron Hall were in the Australian Christian metal band Lightforce. Recording sessions took place at Oasis Studios in Melbourne and Timbertop Recording Studios in Ringwood, Victoria. The original version of Break the Curse was a cassette tape-based demo with six songs. The band was renamed to Mortification shortly afterward. On Mortification's self-titled debut studio album, the song "Infectious Growth" was renamed "The Destroyer Beholds". In November 1993, the demo was remastered by Doug Saunders at Toybox Studios in Northcote, Victoria, and four more songs were included.

Track listing

Re-recorded for Mortification's self-titled debut studio album (1991)
Re-recorded for Post Momentary Affliction (1993)
Re-recorded as "God Rulz" on Hammer of God (1999)

Song from Lightforce's debut album, Battlezone (1987)
Songs from Noah Sat Down and Listened to the Mortification Live E.P. While Having a Coffee (1996)

Personnel

Lightforce/Mortification
Steve Rowe – vocals, bass guitar
Jayson Sherlock – drums
Cameron Hall – guitars

Production
Doug Saunders – producer, engineer (Lightforce version), remastering (1994 Mortification version)
Markus Staiger – executive producer (Mortification version)

Additional personnel
Dave Berryman – photography
Greg Haur – layout (Lightforce version)
Steve Dash – cover art (Lightforce version)
Mike Maxwell – cover illustration (Mortification version)
Scott Waters (Ultimatum) – design, layout (2022 version)
Paul D. Clifford – remastering at PCP Studios in Australia (2022 version)
Rob Colwell – live track remastering at Bombworks Sound in McKinney, Texas (2022 version)

References

Mortification (band) albums
1990 albums
Demo albums